Mahaska County is a county located in the U.S. state of Iowa. As of the 2020 census, the population was 22,190. The county seat is Oskaloosa.

Mahaska County comprises the Oskaloosa, IA Micropolitan Statistical Area.

History

Mahaska County was formed in February 1843. The county has been self-governing since February 5, 1844. It was named after Chief Mahaska of the Iowa tribe. The county was the first in Iowa to have a sheriff and a justice of peace.

The first courthouse was completed in January 1846. When a larger structure was required, the second courthouse was constructed in 1885–86, first being used on February 27, 1886. The first school, a small log cabin one-half mile (ca. 2 km) east of Oskaloosa, was opened on September 16, 1844, and the Cumberland Presbyterian Church opened as the first church in 1846. On July 2, 1850, the first edition of the Iowa Herald was issued (today the Oskaloosa Herald). The first tracks of the Des Moines Valley Railroad were laid through the county in 1864.

Coal mining was once a major industry in Mahaska County.

Geography

Major highways
 U.S. Highway 63
 Iowa Highway 23
 Iowa Highway 92
 Iowa Highway 163
 Iowa Highway 146
 Iowa Highway 149

Transit
 List of intercity bus stops in Iowa

Adjacent counties
Jasper County  (northwest)
Poweshiek County  (north)
Keokuk County  (east)
Wapello County  (southeast)
Monroe County  (southwest)
Marion County  (west)

Demographics

2020 census
There were 9,680 housing units, of which 8,799 were occupied.

2010 census
There were 9,766 housing units, of which 8,975 were occupied.

2000 census

As of the census of 2000, there were 22,335 people, 8,880 households, and 6,144 families residing in the county. The population density was 39 people per square mile (15/km2). There were 9,551 housing units at an average density of 17 per square mile (6/km2). The racial makeup of the county was 97.20% White, 0.64% Black or African American, 0.19% Native American, 0.86% Asian, 0.03% Pacific Islander, 0.30% from other races, and 0.78% from two or more races. 0.85% of the population were Hispanic or Latino of any race.

There were 8,880 households, out of which 32.40% had children under the age of 18 living with them, 58.60% were married couples living together, 7.50% had a female householder with no husband present, and 30.80% were non-families. 26.60% of all households were made up of individuals, and 12.40% had someone living alone who was 65 years of age or older. The average household size was 2.45 and the average family size was 2.96.

In the county, the population was spread out, with 25.70% under the age of 18, 9.40% from 18 to 24, 26.80% from 25 to 44, 21.70% from 45 to 64, and 16.30% who were 65 years of age or older. The median age was 37 years. For every 100 females there were 99.10 males. For every 100 females age 18 and over, there were 96.90 males.

The median income for a household in the county was $37,314, and the median income for a family was $43,557. Males had a median income of $32,618 versus $23,192 for females. The per capita income for the county was $18,232. About 7.50% of families and 9.80% of the population were below the poverty line, including 11.70% of those under age 18 and 9.30% of those age 65 or over.

Communities

Cities

Barnes City
Beacon
Eddyville
Fremont
Keomah Village
Leighton
New Sharon
Oskaloosa
Rose Hill
University Park

Unincorporated communities

Cedar
Hopewell
Indianapolis
Lacey
Lakonta

Townships

 Adams
 Black Oak
 Cedar
 East Des Moines
 Garfield
 Harrison
 Jefferson
 Lincoln
 Madison
 Monroe
 Pleasant Grove
 Prairie
 Richland
 Scott
 Spring Creek
 Union
 West Des Moines
 White Oak

Population ranking
The population ranking of the following table is based on the 2020 census of Mahaska County.

† county seat

Politics
Mahaska County is a strongly Republican county. Only six Republican Party presidential candidates from 1880 to the present day have failed to win the county, most recently Barry Goldwater in 1964 in his landslide loss statewide & nationally to Lyndon B. Johnson.

See also

Mahaska County Courthouse
National Register of Historic Places listings in Mahaska County, Iowa

References

External links

Mahaska County website

 
Iowa placenames of Native American origin
1843 establishments in Iowa Territory
Populated places established in 1843